A list of films produced in the Soviet Union in 1953 (see 1953 in film) follows:

See also
1953 in the Soviet Union

References

External links
 Soviet films of 1953 at the Internet Movie Database

1953
Lists of 1953 films by country or language
Films